Fishermans Bay is a small suburb of the Port Stephens local government area in the Hunter Region of New South Wales, Australia. It is located on the coast of the Tasman Sea adjacent to Anna Bay. A large part of the eastern portion of the suburb is occupied by Tomaree National Park and only a very small portion of the south western corner of the suburb is populated. The suburb is named after the adjacent bay.

Notes

References

Suburbs of Port Stephens Council
Bays of New South Wales